TOX high mobility group box family member 2, also known as TOX2, is a human gene.

The protein encoded by this gene is a member of a subfamily of transcription factors that also includes TOX, TOX3, and TOX4 that share almost identical HMG-box DNA-binding domains which function to modify chromatin structure.

References

Transcription factors